The 2005 Asian Fencing Championships was held at the Likas Sports Complex, Kota Kinabalu, Sabah, Malaysia from 25 July to 30 July 2005.

Medal summary

Men

Women

Medal table

References

FIE Annual Report
Individual Results

External links
Official website

Asian Championship
F
Asian Fencing Championships
International sports competitions hosted by Malaysia